Filip Janković (Serbian Cyrillic: Филип Јанковић; born 17 January 1995) is a Serbian footballer who plays as an attacking midfielder. He most recently played for Slovenian club Triglav Kranj.

Career
He debuted for Red Star Belgrade first team on 4 August 2011 in the UEFA Europa League qualification match versus Latvian team Ventspils. On that day he had 16 years, 6 months and 18 days, making him the youngest Red Star player who played in UEFA competitions, and second youngest in the club history.

Honours

Club
Red Star
 Serbian Cup (1): 2011–12

International
Serbia
 FIFA U-20 World Cup (1): 2015

Notes

References

External links
 
 

1995 births
Living people
Footballers from Belgrade
Serbian footballers
Association football midfielders
Serbian SuperLiga players
Red Star Belgrade footballers
Serie B players
Parma Calcio 1913 players
Slovenian PrvaLiga players
NK Domžale players
NK Radomlje players
Segunda División B players
Extremadura UD footballers
Córdoba CF B players
NK Triglav Kranj players
Slovenian Second League players
Serbia youth international footballers
Serbian expatriate footballers
Serbian expatriate sportspeople in Italy
Serbian expatriate sportspeople in Slovenia
Serbian expatriate sportspeople in Spain
Expatriate footballers in Italy
Expatriate footballers in Slovenia
Expatriate footballers in Spain